Explorer 24 (also called AD-B, Air Density experiment-B and S-56C) was a NASA satellite designed for atmospheric studies. Explorer 24 was launched on 21 November 1964 from Vandenberg Air Force Base, Lompoc, California, with a Scout X-4. Explorer 24 was launched along with its successor satellite, Explorer 25.

Spacecraft 
Explorer 24 was placed in orbit together with Explorer 25 from a single launch vehicle. Explorer 24 was identical in configuration to the previously launched balloon satellites Explorer 9 and Explorer 19. It was designed to yield atmospheric density near perigee as a function of space and time from sequential observations of the sphere's position in orbit. To facilitate ground tracking, the satellite carried a 136-MHz tracking beacon.

Experiments

Nonsystematic Changes of Air Density 
This experiment was designed to determine nonsystematic changes of the density of the upper atmosphere from studies of the drag on a  diameter low-density sphere caused by short-term differences in solar activity. Density values near perigee were deduced from sequential observations of the spacecraft position, using optical (Baker-Nunn camera network) and radio and/or radar tracking techniques. This experiment resulted in the successful determination of reasonable density values until spacecraft re-entry.

Systematic Changes of Air Density 
This experiment was designed to determine systematic changes of air density as a function of altitude, latitude, and time of day, by measuring the drag on a  diameter low-density sphere with ground tracking.

Results 

The satellite reentered the Earth's atmosphere on 18 October 1968.

See also 

 Explorer S-56
 Explorer 9
 Explorer 19
 Explorer program

References 

Spacecraft launched in 1964
Explorers Program
Balloon satellites